The No Jacket Required World Tour was a concert tour by the English drummer, singer and songwriter Phil Collins, which occurred February–July 1985 in support of his 1985 album, No Jacket Required. The album had been a massive international success and the tour concluded with Collins performing "Against All Odds" and "In the Air Tonight" at both Live Aid concerts, in London and Philadelphia, on 13 July 1985.

During the tour, the music video for "Take Me Home" was filmed on location in various cities where the tour was staged. It was directed by Jim Yukich and produced by Paul Flattery. Flattery/Yukich also directed the video for "Don't Lose My Number" which was shot in various locations in Australia and was a parody of music video directors pitching famous or cliché ideas. It won a Billboard Video Award in 1987.

A television special, also directed by Jim Yukich and produced by Paul Flattery, was recorded at Reunion Arena in Dallas on 29 May 1985, and aired on HBO entitled No Jacket Required... Sold Out. The broadcast was released on VHS and LaserDisc in 1985 with extended footage and the title changed to Phil Collins: No Ticket Required. It won an ACE AWARD for best TV Music special in 1986. Another television special was recorded at the Royal Albert Hall in London, England, for Cinemax show called Album Flash That was also produced by Flattery and directed by Yukich.

Setlist

"I Don't Care Anymore"
"Only You Know And I Know"
"I Cannot Believe It's True"
"This Must Be Love"
"Against All Odds"
"Inside Out"
"Who Said I Would"
"You Know What I Mean" (only in Australia)
"If Leaving Me Is Easy"
"Sussudio"
"Behind The Lines"
"Don't Lose My Number"
"The West Side"
"One More Night"
"In the Air Tonight"
"Like China"
"You Can't Hurry Love"
"It Don't Matter To Me"
"Hand in Hand"
"Take Me Home"
"People Get Ready"
"It's All Right"
"And so to f..."

Tour dates

The Live Aid concerts were notable for Collins performing at both the Philadelphia and London shows. Bob Geldof, the organiser of Live Aid, originally asked Collins to be part of Geldof's first charity effort, Band Aid. Collins provided drums and sang backing vocals for Band Aid's 1984 No. 1 UK hit, "Do They Know It's Christmas?".

For Live Aid Collins first performed with Sting at Wembley Stadium. Together they performed "Roxanne", "Driven to Tears", "Against All Odds", "Message in a Bottle", "In the Air Tonight", "Long Long Way To Go", and "Every Breath You Take". After Collins finished performing, he boarded a Concorde flight to the U.S. to enable him to perform at the Philadelphia show. On the plane, he met Cher, and convinced her to be part of the event. Robert Plant had asked Collins if he would perform with Jimmy Page and Tony Thompson and he in a Led Zeppelin reunion of sorts. At the concert he began by playing drums on "Layla", "White Room" and "She's Waiting" for friend Eric Clapton. Collins performed "Against All Odds" and "In the Air Tonight" and finished the night playing drums for Led Zeppelin's aforementioned act.

Tour band
For the tour, Collins retained his usual cast of musicians, including Chester Thompson, Leland Sklar and Daryl Stuermer. The band was nicknamed the "Hot Tub Club".

 Phil Collins – vocals, piano, drums, percussion
 Daryl Stuermer – guitar, backing vocals
 Leland Sklar – bass, backing vocals
 Peter Robinson – piano, keyboards, vocoder
 Chester Thompson – drums, percussion
 The Phenix Horns
 Rahmlee Michael Davis – trumpet, percussion, backing vocals
 Michael Harris – trumpet, percussion, backing vocals
 Don Myrick – saxophone, percussion, backing vocals
 Louis Satterfield – trombone, percussion, backing vocals

References

Phil Collins concert tours
1985 concert tours